Silence, also known as The Power of Silence, is a 2013 Malayalam thriller film directed by V. K. Prakash and starring Mammootty, Anoop Menon, Pallavi Purohit, Joy Mathew and Jayaprakash Kuloor. The climax of the film is based on the 2011 South Korean courtroom thriller film The Client.

Plot
Arvind Chandrasekhar, a very successful lawyer with a track record any one would dream about, is appointed judge in the Karnataka High Court. Happily living in Bangalore with his wife Sangeetha and their adorable children Arya and Aditya, the man has little to fret over. Before taking the oath, he visits his parents in Kerala. There he is harassed by threatening phone call from a veiled assailant who says he is not fit to be a judge. Arvind ignores the calls at first but things get serious when his wife and children face dangerous situations. The film narrates how he unveils the mystery with the help of his close friend Neil George, an IPS officer.

Cast
 Mammootty as Advocate Arvind Chandrasekhar, later Justice Aravind Chandrashekar
 Anoop Menon as DIG Neil George IPS, Bangalore City Police
 Pallavi Purohit as Sangeetha
 Joy Mathew as Markos
 Jayaprakash Kuloor as the priest
 Aparna Nair as Liji
 Sudheer Karamana as DYSP Sajan
 Romanch as Convict
 Basil Joseph as John
 Jinu Joy as Roy
 Ravi Vallathol
 Raghavan
 Prakash Bare
 Sreelatha Namboothiri
 Balachandran Chullikad
 Shankar Ramakrishnan
 P. Balachandran
 Sneha Nambiar

Critical reception
Kiran Joseph JKV wrote in his review for Deccan Herald: "Started off well, never even half done, this Silence fades into oblivion, silently." Ajin Krishna of Oneindia.in rated the film 2/5 and said, "Silence fails to impress the viewers as a thriller flick, which is the basic purpose of such movies." Paresh C Palicha of Rediff.com rated the film 2.5/5 and said, "Silence is the first attempt at serious film making from the writer-director team of Y V Rajesh and V K Prakash after low-brow comedies such as Gulumaal and Three Kings. It is notches above the previous attempts and highly watchable." However the reviewer felt that the film "borrows heavily from the Richard Gere starrer, Primal Fear (1996).".

References

2013 films
2010s Malayalam-language films
Indian thriller films
2010s thriller films
Legal thriller films
Indian courtroom films
Indian legal films
Films directed by V. K. Prakash